Roški Slap Hydroelectric Power Plant is a hydroelectric power plant on river Krka, located in Šibenik-Knin County, in central Dalmatia, Croatia.

The Roški Slap - Hydroelectric Power Plant is a very small power plant of only 1MW. It was built in 1910 on the Krka River near the Miljevci village, east from the town of Drniš, some 25–30 km downstream from the town of Knin.

It is operated by Hrvatska elektroprivreda.

The Krka River catchment Hydropower structures
Golubić Hydroelectric Power Plant
Small Krčić Hydroelectric Power Plant
Miljacka Hydroelectric Power Plant
Roški Slap Hydroelectric Power Plant
Jaruga Hydroelectric Power Plant

See also

Krka
Krka National Park
Drniš

References

Hydroelectric power stations in Croatia
Buildings and structures in Šibenik-Knin County